Francisco Solano López Grance (born 30 June 1987) is a Paraguayan professional footballer.

References

External links

1987 births
Living people
Association football forwards
Paraguayan footballers
Paraguayan expatriate footballers
Cerro Porteño (Presidente Franco) footballers